Che is the Mandarin pinyin romanization of the Chinese surname written  in traditional Chinese and  in simplified Chinese. It is listed 229th in the Song dynasty classic text Hundred Family Surnames. As of 2008, it is the 191st most common surname in China, shared by 540,000 people. It is romanized Cha in Korean.

Notable people
 Michael Che (born 1983), American comedian
 Catherine Che (1952–2021), Hong Kong ten-pin bowling player
 Che Dingjin (車鼎晉; 1668–1733), Qing dynasty scholar and poet, son of Che Wanyu
 Che Jun (born 1955), Governor of Zhejiang province
 Che Qingyun (車慶雲; 1881–?), Republic of China general
 Che Runqiu (born 1990), football player
 Stephanie Che (born 1974), Hong Kong singer and actress
 Che Xiangchen (车向忱; 1898–1971), Vice-Governor of Liaoning province
 Che Yanjiang (車炎江; born 1969), Taiwanese singer
 Che Yin (車胤; 4th century), Eastern Jin dynasty official
 Che Yonghong (車永宏; 1833–1914), martial artist, Xing Yi Quan master
 Che Yongli (born 1980), actress
 Che Wanyu (車萬育; 1632–1705), Qing dynasty scholar-official
 Che Zhou (車冑; died 199 AD), Eastern Han dynasty general under Cao Cao

References

Chinese-language surnames
Individual Chinese surnames